The Victorino Cunha Cup is an annual Angolan basketball tournament held in honour of former Angolan basketball coach Victorino Cunha. The 4th edition (2012), ran from October 15 to 17, and was contested by four teams in a round robin system. Primeiro de Agosto was the winner.

Schedule

Round 1

Round 2

Round 3

Final standings

Awards

See also
 2012 BAI Basket
 2012 Angola Basketball Cup
 2012 Angola Basketball Super Cup

References

Victorino Cunha Cup seasons
Victorino